Sughdiyona also Sogdiana — formerly Karmysh or Qarmishi tojik — is a village in Sughd Region, northern Tajikistan. It is part of the jamoat Nofaroj in the city of Istaravshan.

References

Populated places in Sughd Region